Asteropeia mcphersonii, a species of plant in the Asteropeiaceae family, is a shrub to large tree, up to 25 meters tall.  Its oval leaves are about twice as long as they are wide and have a leathery texture. It is endemic to Madagascar, distributed in mid-elevation forest in a narrow band from Ambatovy to Zahamena RNI.  Its natural habitat is subtropical or tropical moist lowland forests. It is threatened by habitat loss, with an estimated total population of 1000–2,500 mature individuals.

References

Endemic flora of Madagascar
mcphersonii
Vulnerable plants
Taxonomy articles created by Polbot
Flora of the Madagascar lowland forests